This is a list of works by author Joe R. Lansdale.

Dates by original publication; some novels or stories were written years prior to actual publication.

Hap Collins and Leonard Pine Mysteries

Other novels

Short story collections

Western screenplays

The "Drive-In" series

The "Ned the Seal" Trilogy

Pseudonymous novels

Mark Stone: MIA Hunter series
These are a few novels Lansdale wrote under the pseudonym "Jack Buchanan". These novels were co-written with Stephen Mertz, Michael Newton, and Bill Crider. Some people erroneously report that Lansdale is responsible for the entire series, which is definitely not true.

Chapbooks/Pamphlets

Uncollected short stories

Novels and stories with Batman

Comic books and graphic novels

Comic short stories 
Many were adapted to comic books.

Adaptations of previously published stories, by Lansdale unless noted

Screenwriting

Anthologies edited

Essays and memoirs

References

External links
 Official website
 Texas Monthly Article
 Mulholland Books Website
 Subterranean Press Website 
 Vintage Crime/Black Lizard Website
 Dark Regions Press Website
 Pandi Press Official Website
 Bob the Dinosaur Goes to Disneyland comic adaptation
 
 
 

Bibliographies by writer
Bibliographies of American writers
Mystery fiction bibliographies
Horror fiction bibliographies